"United we stand, divided we fall" is a phrase used in many different kinds of mottos, most often to inspire unity and collaboration. Its core concept lies in the collectivist notion that if individual members of a certain group with binding ideals – such as a union, coalition, confederation or alliance – work on their own instead of as a team, they are each doomed to fail and will all be defeated. The phrase is also often referred to with only the words "United we stand".

Historical origin

The phrase has been attributed to the ancient Greek storyteller Aesop, both directly in his fable "The Four Oxen and the Lion"<ref>[http://www.bartleby.com/17/1/52.html The Four Oxen and the Lion] Bartleby's famous quotations</ref> and indirectly in "The Bundle of Sticks".

Christian Bible references
A similar phrase also appears in the biblical "New Testament" – translated into English from the historic Greek in Mark 3:25 as "And if a house be divided against itself, that house cannot stand". Similar verses of the Christian Bible include Matthew 12:25 ("And Jesus knew their thoughts, and said unto them, Every kingdom divided against itself is brought to desolation; and every city or house divided against itself shall not stand") and Luke 11:17 ("But he, knowing their thoughts, said unto them, Every kingdom divided against itself is brought to desolation; and a house divided against a house falleth.").

The 1911 Encyclopaedia Britannica quotes Robert Grosseteste (d. 1253) saying "It is written that united we stand and divided we fall."

Use in U.S. history
The first attributed use in modern times is to Founding Father John Dickinson in his pre-Revolutionary War song "The Liberty Song", first published on July 7, 1768, in both the Pennsylvania Journal and Pennsylvania Gazette newspapers. In the song Dickinson wrote:  "Then join hand in hand, brave Americans all! By uniting we stand, by dividing we fall!".

Patrick Henry used the phrase in his last public speech, given in March 1799, in which he denounced The Kentucky and Virginia Resolutions. Clasping his hands and swaying unsteadily, Henry declaimed, "Let us trust God, and our better judgment to set us right hereafter. United we stand, divided we fall. Let us not split into factions which must destroy that union upon which our existence hangs." At the end of his oration, Henry fell into the arms of bystanders and was carried, almost lifeless, into a nearby tavern. Two months afterward, he died.

During his unsuccessful campaign against Stephen Douglas in 1858, Abraham Lincoln gave a speech centered on the House divided analogy to illustrate the need for a universal decision on slavery across all states.

Since 1942, this phrase has been the official English language state motto of Kentucky.

On the Missouri flag, the phrase is also written around the center circle.

Modern political uses
Examples of political uses outside the U.S. include the following:
 This statement was also a common phrase used in India to garner political support during struggle for independence from the British Empire most notably by A.C. Majumdar at the 1916 Lucknow session at Congress. 
 Winston Churchill, June 16, 1941 used the phrase "United we stand. Divided we fall" in a broadcast from London to the US on receiving an Honorary Degree from the University of Rochester
 The motto is also used by Ulster loyalists, and can be seen in some loyalist Northern Irish murals. 
 The Economist edition that appeared during Brexit was entitled "Divided we fall".
 The president of the European Council, Donald Tusk, used the motto in his letter of invitation to the heads of state and government of the EU, for their informal summit in Valletta, Malta, on February 3, 2017. Tusk addressed the motto to the leaders of the 27 member states of the future EU without the United Kingdom.
 Former South Korean president, Syngman Rhee, is credited with using the following variation: "united we live, divided we die."

Popular culture
Examples in popular culture include the following:
 The phrase "United we stand" is featured in the song "Death By A Thousand Cuts" by Taylor Swift.
 The lyrics "United we stand, divided we fall" are featured in the 1970 hit song "United We Stand" performed by the Brotherhood of Man (written by Tony Hiller and Peter Simons). This song was also performed by Sonny and Cher and Elton John.
 Geraldo Pino used the phrase in the song "Shake Hands".
 In the song "Hey You" (performed and written by the band Pink Floyd), a similar term with the same meaning, "Together we stand, divided we fall", is used as the final lyrics.
 Tupac Shakur used the line "united we stand, divided we fall.." in the song "Last Wordz" of his second album Strictly 4 My N.I.G.G.A.Z. featuring Ice Cube and Ice-T.
 Wilbert Harrison used the similar "Together we'll stand, Divided we'll fall" in his song "Let's Work Together".
 In the Sum 41 song "Confusion And Frustration In Modern Times", the phrase "Divided we stand, Together we fall" is used. New York Hardcore punk band Agnostic Front use the lyrics "United we stand, divided we fall, Gotta gotta go" in their song "Gotta Go", which was featured on Punk-O-Rama Vol. 3.  Punk band Smoke or Fire also used the reverse lyric "United we stand, divided we'll fall" in their song "What Separates Us All", from their 2007 album This Sinking Ship.
 "United we stand, divided we fall" features on the track 'I and I' by The Abyssinians, on the B-side of the classic 1976 album Satta Massagana.
 The Dutch band Heideroosjes use the lyrics in their song "Time is Ticking Away". It is also used in The Dropkick Murphys' "Boys on the Docks". The 3rd Mission in Operation Flashpoint Dragon Rising is called "United we stand". A slightly different version is mentioned by the heavy metal band Judas Priest in his song "United" ("united we stand, united we never shall fall"). 3T also used the exact words on their debut album Brotherhood, the song being entitled "Brotherhood" also.
 Australian artist Kid Mac used the phrase in his song titled "My Brothers Keeper" on his album titled No Man's Land.
 The reverse was also used by Def Leppard in the song "When Love & Hate Collide", "..divided we stand, baby, united we fall" and in The Strokes song "Someday", "See, alone we stand, together we fall apart".
 It also appears in the song "United", by the Finnish power metal group Stratovarius.
 In the album Nero from Two Steps from Hell, one of the tracks is titled "United We Stand, Divided We Fall".  It was also included on their subsequent album Archangel.
 The phrase "United stand! Divided fall!" appears in the Norwegian folk metal/viking metal group Glittertinds song "Longships and Mead".
 "Together we stand, divided we fall" is repeated various times in the song "Killing ground" by longtime English metal band Saxon.
 Divided We Fall and United We Stand are events in the Marvel Comics series Ultimate Comics: The Ultimates.
 The phrase also appeared in the "United We Stand" episode of Power Rangers Megaforce.
 "United We Stand" and "Divided We Fall" are sequential songs in the Thomas Was Alone soundtrack. Deathcore band Bring Me the Horizon uses the phrase "United we fail, divided we fall." in their song "Anti-vist."
 An episode of Justice League Unlimited season 2 is titled "Divided We Fall" which features the League's original seven founding members.
 J. K. Rowling in her book Harry Potter and the Goblet of Fire says "We are only as strong as we are united, as weak as we are divided."
 In the C.G.I. Transformers show Transformers Prime, this phrase is played upon. As Megatron succeeds in destroying the Autobot base and chasing out the Autobots after an intense war, he and Starscream visit the ruins with Starscream commenting. "United we stand, divided they fall." Rather than attributing both values to one party, each is shown to have a respective value at that time, especially given Starscream has recently rejoined the Decepticons.
 The statement is used in videos released in 2012 by the "hacktivist" group Anonymous.
 "For together we stand, divided we fall" is mentioned in the opening line of the chorus for the Donna Cruz song "Yesterday's Dream".
 Asian Dub Foundation said in their song called "The Judgement": "Present and the future we will never fall/Realize united we stand and divided we fall"
 The 2013 video game Grand Theft Auto V features a variant of the phrase; 'United We Stand, Together We Fall - Thanks for the bailout America' in an in-game commercial for the car manufacturer Bravado.
 Marvel Studios repeated the phrase, "United We Stand, Divided We Fall," during their Super Bowl 50 ad for Captain America: Civil War.
 In Fallout 4 while gaining entrance to the armory room at the Castle, the password for the terminal is "United We Stand". "United We Stand" is also the name of the perk the player gets for reaching the highest rank of character affinity with Preston Garvey, a key member of the Commonwealth Minutemen faction. The perk makes the player deal 20% more damage and provides +20 damage resistance when fighting against three or more enemies.
 Norwegian black metal band Darkthrone named one song on their album Hate Them "Divided We Stand".
 The verse is used repetitively in British cabaret trio Fascinating Aïda's Brexit reaction song.
 The phrase "Divided We Fall" is used as the title of a play by Bryan Starchman, emphasizing the need for troubled teenagers to come together in order to stand as one and help each other cope with various problems.
 The Broadway musical Newsies uses the phrase "Union, we stand... hey that's not bad, someone write that down" said by the main character and newsboy union leader, Jack Kelly. This was said before the Newsies went on strike.
 In The Railway Series story: Down the Mine from Gordon the Big Engine Gordon who pulled Thomas out from the mine uses this phrase, only this time, it's called "United we stand, together we fall."
 The phrase is referenced in the lyrics: "United we stand, yet divided we fall.  Together, we can stand tall.", from the Public Enemy song 'Brother's Gonna Work It Out', from the album Fear of a Black Planet (1990).
 Marillion varied the phrase to "Divided we stand, together we'll rise" in the song White Feather on the album Misplaced Childhood (1985). 
 In the 2017 action-adventure survival game, ARK: Survival Evolved, there is a PVP alliance on Xbox servers known as UWS or United We Stand.
 Divided We Fall is a 501c(3) non-profit news publication dedicated to providing bipartisan dialogue to the politically engaged.
 The M*A*S*H* episode, "Divided We Stand", was broadcast in 1973.
 The motto "Together we stand, divided we fall" is sung near the ending of the second section of the song "Canone Inverso (Luxury Goods)" by the Italian band Bluvertigo.

 See also 
 The Sznajd model — also referred to as "United we stand, divided we fall (USDF) model".
 Join, or Die''

References

External links
 USgennet.org
 Quotationspage.com

State mottos of the United States
Symbols of Kentucky
American nationalism
Nationalism